Drosophila ananassae is a species of fruit fly that is a useful model organism for genetic studies because it is easily cultured in the laboratory, and was one of 12 fruitfly genomes sequenced for a large comparative study.

References

External links 
 Drosophila ananassae at FlyBase
 Drosophila ananassae at Ensembl Genomes Metazoa
 

A